Ashley Weinhold and Caitlin Whoriskey were the defending champions, however both players chose to participate with different partners. Weinhold played alongside Naomi Broady, but lost in the first round to Desirae Krawczyk and Giuliana Olmos. Whoriskey partnered Jacqueline Cako, but they were defeated in the first round by Julia Boserup and Lesley Kerkhove.

Kaitlyn Christian and Sabrina Santamaria won the title, defeating Jessica Pegula and Maria Sanchez in the final, 7–5, 4–6, [10–8].

Seeds

Draw

Draw

External Links
Main Draw

Dow Tennis Classic - Doubles